Irréprochable (English: Faultless) is a 2016 French thriller film written and directed by Sébastien Marnier. The film stars Marina Foïs, Jérémie Elkaïm, Joséphine Japy, and Benjamin Biolay.

Plot 
Out of job for over a year, Constance returns to her hometown when she learns that the real estate agency where she first began her career is hiring again. Her former boss prefers Audrey, a candidate who is much younger than Constance. But Constance will do anything to reclaim the position that she considers to be her own.

Cast 
 Marina Foïs as Constance
 Jérémie Elkaïm as Philippe
 Joséphine Japy as Audrey
 Benjamin Biolay as Gilles
 Jean-Luc Vincent as Alain
 Jeanne Rosa as Nathalie
 Véronique Ruggia Saura as Lawyer

Accolades

References

External links 
 

2016 films
2010s thriller films
2010s psychological drama films
2010s French-language films
French thriller films
2016 directorial debut films
2016 drama films
2010s French films